The 1969 Pacific hurricane season was an  event in meteorology. It officially started on May 15, 1969, in the eastern Pacific and lasted until November 30, 1969. However, the first named storm, Ava, did not form until July 1, the latest date that the first named storm of a season formed. These dates conventionally delimit the period of each year when most tropical cyclones form in the northeastern Pacific Ocean.

This season was below average in activity with ten named storms forming, of which only four reached hurricane strength, making it the third least active season, tied with the 1995 and 1979 seasons. There were no major hurricanes this year. Most of the storms that formed this season never approached land.

Notable storms include Tropical Storm Emily and Hurricane Jennifer. The precursor disturbance of Tropical Storm Emily killed nine people in Mexico and left 100,000 homeless. Hurricane Jennifer was the only landfalling named storm of the season, causing one death. In this season, only three storms (Ava, Bernice, and Florence) were operationally categorized as tropical depressions at the first advisory. All other storms were operationally upgraded directly to storm strength, bypassing the depression stage.



Systems

Tropical Depression One

The first depression of the season formed off the coast of Mexico on May 30 and moved westward. The depression dissipated the next day.

Tropical Depression Two

Tropical Depression Two formed on June 4 and lasted until June 5, when the storm was considered dissipated. The depression would regenerate on June 7, but, like its previous time active, only lasted until the day later, only this time, the depression never regenerated.

Tropical Storm Ava

On June 30, an area of convection formed off the coast of Guatemala. The system showed no signs of development when June ended, but on July 1 the storm began gaining organization and, after a circulation had developed, was deemed a tropical depression. The depression further intensified, becoming a tropical storm on July 2. Ava tracked west-northwestward at a pace of  while going through steady intensification. On July 7, Ava was downgraded to a depression while near Socorro Island and the last advisory was issued on the weakened Ava later that day. The remains of Ava continued northwest and then took a westward move on July 10. By this point, Ava had completely dissipated.

Despite its proximity to land, no reports of damages or deaths were reported in connection to Ava. When Ava formed on July 1, it became the latest that a tropical storm had formed in the East Pacific basin.

Hurricane Bernice

The system that became Hurricane Bernice was an area of disturbed weather. After signs of a circulation appeared on July 8, the system was designated a tropical depression. The depression developed and strengthened into Tropical Storm Bernice on July 10. Bernice continued a west-northwestard motion and, on July 12, achieved Category 1 strength. Afterwards, Bernice began to weaken, with it being downgraded into a storm on July 15. Further weakening commenced, and Bernice was downgraded to a depression on July 16. The final advisory on Bernice was issued on July 17. Bernice never affected land.

Bernice can be seen in photographs taken by Apollo 11 on the 16th, and could also be seen in a TV broadcast made by the astronauts.

Tropical Storm Claudia

On July 21, a tropical depression advisory was issued on a loosely organized area of convection based on satellite pictures because of a lack of ships reporting in the area where it formed. On July 22, it was decided that the system had achieved enough organization to become a tropical storm and was named Claudia. Claudia's time as a tropical storm was brief; it was downgraded into a depression on July 23, only 24 hours after first becoming a storm. The storm continued to weaken, dissipating later that day.

Because of a lack of shipping near where Claudia existed, intensity forecasts were based almost entirely on satellite presentation. The only ship near the storm was a Navy vessel named Fernie. The ship reported an eastward wind of  about 50 miles from the center and a pressure of 1006 mb.

Hurricane Doreen

Like Claudia before it, Doreen's formation (which started as a large cloud mass on the ITCZ) went mostly unmonitored by ship because of a lack of shipping. On August 4, a relatively unusual cirrus cloud formation resembling a pinwheel formed over the center of the storm. The formation had provided efficient evidence that the system had developed into a tropical storm, bypassing the depression stage. Doreen continued a northwest track, deepening along the way, and on August 5, a ship reported  winds with a 993 mb pressure near the storm center. Based on this, Doreen was upgraded to a hurricane, the second of the season.

From here, Doreen began to take a more west-northwest path, passing by Socorro Island on August 6. On August 7, Doreen's eye broke up and, as a result, Doreen quickly weakened, being downgraded into a tropical storm shortly afterward. Continued weakening brought Doreen down to a depression on August 8, when Doreen slowed to a crawl. Doreen held on to depression strength until August 9, when it entered an area of easterlies, which did nothing to help the already-weakening Doreen, but rather dissipating it quickly. Traces of Doreen continued to show up on satellite until August 11, when no traces remained.

Tropical Depression Seven

A very short lived storm, Tropical Depression Seven formed off the coast of Mexico on August 5, dissipating the same day.

Tropical Storm Emily 

Emily's origins can be traced back to a large low-pressure center over Mexico that persisted from August 20 to August 21.  During that time, thunderstorm activity flared up over the Mexican mainland, but no evidence of a circulation was found. However, on August 21, a circulation developed at around 14° N and was apparent on weather maps, but at the time, no major winds were suspected near the center.  Finally, on August 22, a ship in the area reported 45-50 mph (72–80 km/h) winds, and based on this report, the system was initiated as Tropical Storm Emily, becoming the third storm in a row to have been upgraded straight to tropical storm strength, bypassing depression stage. From this point on, early reports on Emily were plagued by delays, namely the initial formation report, which was delayed long enough to miss the first advisory. A 998 mb pressure was recorded in Emily on August 23 and Emily reached its peak intensity of  later that day, with a circular eye being reported by recon. Suddenly, Emily started rapidly weakening, becoming poorly defined later that day, and by August 24, no traces of Emily remained.

While no casualties or damages were reported in connection to Emily, the low-pressure center that formed Emily was responsible for nine deaths on the mainland and rendered 100,000 homeless due to flooding.

Tropical Storm Florence

A low-pressure area that persisted off the coast of Mexico produced squalls during late August and early September. On September 2, the system developed and became a tropical depression. The depression was deemed a storm after satellite imagery showed a cloud pattern typical of a tropical storm and the depression was upgraded after the fact.

On September 7, Florence moved into colder water, which took a fast and heavy toll on Florence, weakening it to a depression shortly afterward and, not long after the downgrade, Florence had dissipated.

Hurricane Glenda

The remains of what was formerly Hurricane Francelia crossed over Central America and contributed to an area of convection that formed 120 miles southwest of Acapulco. A separate mass of clouds existed west-northwest of the main disturbance but, unlike the former, this mass did not organize. The storm began to organize and, like nearly all other storms of this season, Glenda was named on September 7, bypassing the depression phase when a report from a ship indicated a barometric pressure of 997 mb and was falling rapidly as well as reporting heavy showers. Glenda continued its motion northwest while increasing in strength, with a closed eye being noticed on September 9. Because of the closed eye and cirrus cap, it was determined that Glenda had become a hurricane.

Glenda's time as a hurricane was very short lived as it was downgraded to a storm just six hours after the initial upgrade. The weakening trend continued while it moved northwest, towards the Baja California Peninsula, but Glenda moved westward, avoiding landfall. It dissipated on September 12.

Tropical Storm Heather

The information is unclear on how Heather developed but she was first noticed on September 18 1,000 miles southwest of La Paz, Baja California. Like Claudia and Doreen, Heather's lifespan was mostly monitored by satellite and Air Force recon because of a lack of shipping in the general area. From where it first grew, Heather moved west-northwest, reached its peak intensity of  winds, and then eventually weakened to a depression on September 22 and was considered dissipated. On September 23, however, Heather regenerated. Heather would begin to accelerate, followed by a westward motion on September 25, dissipating later that day, this time for good.

Heather's peak intensity was kept at 65 mph both operationally and in post-season because of cool inflow. However, Heather's satellite presentation more resembled a hurricane, showing broad spiral arms.

Tropical Storm Irah

Radio interference and low angle plagued research into a possible circulation that had developed in an area of the ITCZ during September 28 and September 29. Finally, on September 30, a depression was thought to have developed. However, a bulletin from a different source provided with a mosaic image was the evidence used in giving the system the name Irah and treating it as a tropical storm. Irah moved west-northwest until October 1, when it curved northward. By this point, Irah had started weakening, dropping into a depression on October 3. Shortly afterward, Irah had degenerated into an area of squalls.

Tropical Depression Thirteen

Tropical Depression Thirteen formed off the coast of Mexico on October 3. Moving north-northwest, the depression made landfall late on October 4, dissipating soon thereafter. No deaths or damages were reported in connection to the depression.

Tropical Depression Fourteen

Tropical Depression Fourteen formed on October 4 and dissipated the day after.

Hurricane Jennifer

The final storm of the season, Jennifer, had a similar origin to Irah when it originated from an area of disturbed weather on the ITCZ. The system proceeded to develop and became a tropical disturbance, but no reports showed that the system was a tropical cyclone, although they reported  winds and showers. On October 8, a German ship in the area relayed a message to the bureau mentioning an area with a 995 mb pressure (the ship had previously recorded 1003 mb before it sharply fell to the 995 reported). Later, another ship reported  winds in the vicinity, prompting the advisories that Tropical Storm Jennifer had formed. Jennifer moved to the northwest, obtaining hurricane strength on October 9. Then Jennifer turned to the northeast while accelerating, ending up about 60 miles west of Mazatlán. Around this time, a dropsonde malfunction ceased any penetration into the storm, but the plane estimated the winds of the storm to be  winds. On late October 11, Jennifer moved onshore and dissipated on October 12.

Jennifer was reported to have killed one person and injured 15, all in Mazatlán. Jennifer also caused a ferry and twelves boats used for fishing shrimp to be washed up in the Mazatlán Harbor. Over 30 other shrimp boats were reported missing, but were moored in unknown areas. Damage was reportedly extensive, but no monetary figures exist.

Storm names
The following names were used for named storms that formed in the eastern Pacific in 1969. No names were retired, so it was used again in the 1973 season. This is the same list as list 2 used during 1960–1965, except for Heather, which replaced Hazel. A storm was named Heather for the first time in 1969. Names that were not assigned are marked in gray.

The Central Pacific used names and numbers from the Western Pacific's typhoon list. No systems formed in the area, and thus no names were required.

See also

 1969 Atlantic hurricane season
 1969 Pacific typhoon season
 1969 North Indian Ocean cyclone season
 Australian region cyclone seasons: 1968–69 1969–70
 South Pacific cyclone seasons: 1968–69 1969–70
 South-West Indian Ocean cyclone seasons: 1968–69 1969–70
 List of tropical cyclones

References

External links
 Best track (UNISYS) archive
 Documents-1969 Summary

 
Pacific hurricane seasons
Articles which contain graphical timelines